Edward Clinton McFetridge (April 15, 1836February 17, 1914) was an American lawyer, businessman, and Republican politician.  He was the 9th State Treasurer of Wisconsin (1882–1887) and served 4 years in the Wisconsin Legislature, representing Dodge County.

Biography

Born in Rochester, New York, he was admitted to the New York bar. He moved to Beaver Dam, Wisconsin in 1858, where he practiced law and opened a woolen mill. He served as mayor of Beaver Dam, as county treasurer of Dodge County, Wisconsin, and he also sat on the Dodge County Board of Supervisors. He was a presidential elector in 1872. He served in the Wisconsin State Assembly from 1878 to 1881 and in the Wisconsin State Senate from 1879 until 1880. He also served as the Wisconsin state treasurer from 1882 until 1887. McFetridge died at his home in Beaver Dam, Wisconsin in 1914.

References

1836 births
1914 deaths
Politicians from Rochester, New York
Politicians from Beaver Dam, Wisconsin
County supervisors in Wisconsin
Mayors of places in Wisconsin
State treasurers of Wisconsin
Wisconsin state senators
Members of the Wisconsin State Assembly
Businesspeople from Wisconsin
New York (state) lawyers
Wisconsin lawyers
19th-century American politicians
Lawyers from Rochester, New York
Businesspeople from Rochester, New York
19th-century American businesspeople
19th-century American lawyers